968 Petunia (prov. designation:  or ), is a stony asteroid of the Itha family, approximately  in diameter, located in the outer region of the asteroid belt. It was discovered on 24 November 1921, by astronomer Karl Reinmuth at the Heidelberg Observatory in southern Germany. The bright S-type asteroid has a long rotation period of 61.3 hours. It was named after the genus of flowering plants, Petunia.

Orbit and classification 

When applying the synthetic hierarchical clustering method (HCM) by Nesvorný, Petunia is a member of the Itha family, a small family of stony asteroids in the outer main belt, named after 918 Itha. However, it is a background asteroid according to another HCM-analysis by Milani and Knežević (AstDys). Petunia orbits the Sun at a distance of 2.5–3.3 AU once every 4 years and 10 months (1,772 days; semi-major axis of 2.87 AU). Its orbit has an eccentricity of 0.14 and an inclination of 12° with respect to the ecliptic. The asteroid was first observed at Heidelberg Observatory on 25 October 1921, where the body's observation arc begins with its official discovery observation one month later on 24 November 1921.

Naming 

This minor planet was named after a genus of tropical American herbs, Petunia. This genus of flowering plants belongs to the family of Solanaceae (nightshades) and shows funnel-shaped corollas. The  was mentioned in The Names of the Minor Planets by Paul Herget in 1955. Only a minority of minor planets are after animals and plants.

Physical characteristics 

Petunia is a common stony S-type asteroid in the Tholen classification, in the SDSS-based taxonomy, as well as in the Tholen-like taxonomy of the Small Solar System Objects Spectroscopic Survey (S3OS2), while in the SMASS-like taxonomic variant of the S3OS2 survey, it is an Sl subtype, which transitions from the S-type to the L-type asteroids.

Rotation period and pole 

In December 2009, a rotational lightcurve of Petunia was obtained from photometric observations by Robert Stephens at Santana Observatory  and Goat Mountain Astronomical Research Station  in California. Lightcurve analysis gave a long rotation period of  hours with a brightness variation of  magnitude.

Astronomers at the Palomar Transient Factory in California measured a period of  hours and an amplitude of 0.30 magnitude in August 2013, while observations by Italian amateur astronomers Roberto Crippa and Federico Manzini at the Sozzago Astronomical Station  in April 2006 were of poor quality.

A modeled lightcurve using photometric data from the Lowell Photometric Database was published in 2016. It gave a concurring sidereal period of  hours and a spin axis at (355.0°, −78.0°) in ecliptic coordinates (λ, β).

Diameter and albedo 

The Collaborative Asteroid Lightcurve Link adopts the WISE results revised by Pravec, that is an albedo of 0.1654 and a diameter of 29.12 km based on an absolute magnitude of 10.25. These timed observations are taken when the asteroid passes in front of a distant star. However the quality of the measurements are poorly rated.

References

External links 
 Lightcurve Database Query (LCDB), at www.minorplanet.info
 Dictionary of Minor Planet Names, Google books
 Asteroids and comets rotation curves, CdR – Geneva Observatory, Raoul Behrend
 Discovery Circumstances: Numbered Minor Planets (1)-(5000) – Minor Planet Center
 
 

000968
Discoveries by Karl Wilhelm Reinmuth
Named minor planets
000968
19211124